Alfredo Vicente Scherer (5 February 1903–9 March 1996) was a German-Brazilian cardinal of the Roman Catholic Church. He served as Archbishop of Porto Alegre, Brazil from 1946 to 1996, and was elevated to the cardinalate in 1969.

Biography
Alfredo Vicente Scherer was born in Bom Princípio, Rio Grande do Sul, as the second child of Peter and Anna (née Opermann) Scherer. He was a distant relative of Cardinal Odilo Scherer, who became Archbishop of São Paulo in 2007. He studied at the seminary in Porto Alegre and the Pontifical Gregorian University in Rome, where he was ordained to the priesthood on April 3, 1926. He then served as private secretary to Archbishop João Batista Becker until 1933, when he began pastoral work in Porto Alegre.

On 13 June 1946, Scherer was appointed the first auxiliary bishop of Porto Alegre and titular bishop of Hemeria by Pope Pius XII. However, Archbishop Becker died two days later, on 15 June, before Scherer received his episcopal consecration. Scherer was named as his successor as Archbishop of Porto Alegre on the following 30 December. He was consecrated on 23 February 1947, by Archbishop Carlo Chiarlo, Apostolic Nuncio to Brazil, with Bishops José Baréa and José de Almeida Baptista serving as co-consecrators. 

In reference to divorce, the Archbishop once called for "prayers to God to take away from Brazil the calamity which threatens Christian families". Scherer also gave weekly radio broadcasts against "anarchists and followers of Communism" within the Church. He was strongly opposed to liberation theology, and denounced providing birth control pills to "uninformed, impoverished and unattended women" as "a criminal act".

From 1962 to 1965, he attended the Second Vatican Council and was recognized as one of the leading conservative prelates during the 1960s and 1970s. However, Scherer did support the succession of the left-wing João Goulart as president of Brazil following the resignation of Jânio Quadros, as required by the Constitution of Brazil.

Pope Paul VI created him cardinal priest of Nostra Signora de La Salette  in the consistory of 28 April 1969. Scherer was one of the cardinal electors who participated in the conclaves of August and October 1978, which elected Popes John Paul I and John Paul II respectively. In January 1980, he was stabbed and robbed by unknown assailants, who left him in a ditch outside Porto Alegre when he could not meet their demands for more money. 

He resigned as archbishop on 29 August 1981.

Scherer died in Porto Alegre on 8 March 1996 at age 93. He was buried near the altar of the Cathedral of Porto Alegre. In 2003, a commemorative site was arranged at his place of birth in Bom Princípio.

He was provedor of the Fraternity of the Holy House of Mercy until his death, he was also a member of the Rio Grande do Sul Institute of History and Geography.

References

External links
Cardinals of the Holy Roman Church

1903 births
1996 deaths
Brazilian people of German descent
Pontifical Gregorian University alumni
Brazilian cardinals
20th-century Roman Catholic archbishops in Brazil
Brazilian anti-communists
Participants in the Second Vatican Council
Cardinals created by Pope Paul VI
Roman Catholic archbishops of Porto Alegre